Putra Arifin Scheunemann (born 1 May 1987), known professionally as Arifin Putra, is a German-Indonesian actor. His international recognition is largely attributed to his role in the Indonesian action film The Raid 2: Berandal, which was released in the United States and other major markets around the world. He also starred in the 2009 Indonesian horror film, Rumah Dara (released internationally as Macabre).

Early life and education 
Putra Arifin Scheunemann was born on 1 May 1987, in Mainz, Germany. His German father, Axel Scheunemann, was a gardener turned landscape specialist, while his Indonesian mother, Joyce Sunandar, ran a catering business. He has an older sister, Sari, who works at an automotive company in Stuttgart. His parents divorced in 1999, upon which he and his mother permanently resettled to Indonesia. He has reportedly still remain estranged from his father.

Arifin received his early education at the German International School in Jakarta, where he partook in several school plays and showed early interest in acting, often doing reenactments of films for his family. He graduated from the school in 2006 and initially did not intend to pursue a career in the entertainment industry. His parents’ divorce took a toll on him and turned him into a shy and reclusive child, though he eventually regained his cheerful personality with the help and support of his sister. As of 2020, Arifin is pursuing undergraduate studies in business management.

Career 
In 2000, Arifin tagged along with his sister to a television commercial shoot and was offered to be an extra, which he accepted on this occasion. At the end of the shoot, Arifin found himself motivated by the fact that he could earn a bit of extra pocket money while having fun. In the same year, he was a finalist in a cover boy competition hosted by a popular Indonesian teen magazine. Arifin was also in the running for MTV Indonesia’s VJ Hunt in 2003. Despite being unsuccessful in that particular competition, one thing led to another for Arifin, and so began his acting career.

Television (2000 – 2007) 
After landing his first major television role as a nerdy high school student on the national TV series Kisah Kasih di Sekolah (lit. High School Love Story) in 2004, Arifin was catapulted into fame. Weekends were dedicated to promoting the series in different parts of the country, and he soon became an instantly recognizable face. He has described this initial exposure to fame as “surreal and flattering, but very odd”. Deciding that he could pursue this as a career, Arifin enrolled at a notable local acting school Sakti Aktor Studio to receive formal training. He juggled a rigorous schedule of school, shooting and refining his acting skills for one-and-a-half year.

Film (2008 – present) 

Arifin's first film was Lost in Love (2008), a sequel to the teen romance flick Eiffel I’m in Love (2003). In Lost in Love, his character was required to speak in French, English and Indonesian, which came natural to him as he took lessons in these languages as a highschooler. His first antagonist role as Adam, a psychopathic cold-blooded cannibal in Macabre (2009), was a departure from the characters he portrayed in previous works. Arifin's performance in the thriller caught the attention of moviegoers and film critics alike, and earned him a number of nominations and awards including Best Supporting Actor from the KUFI Film Awards.

Observes deem Arifin as a highly curious individual. This is apparent in his deliberate choice of film roles. He is particularly drawn to roles that challenge his comfort zone, as first seen in Macabre and subsequently in The Raid 2: Berandal. In Berandal, Arifin portrays the son of Jakarta's most notorious mob boss who is engulfed in his ambitions. He was first offered the part in 2009, but production of the film was delayed until 2012 due to financial issues. He endured three months of intense training in preparation for the physically demanding role and combed through various mafia movies to gain a deep understanding of his character in the film. His role won him two Best Supporting Actor nominations for the Maya Awards and the Indonesian Movie Actors Awards.

Picking up from the success of Berandal, Arifin is concentrating on film from here on out. His next big project, Supernova: Ksatria, Putri dan Bintang Jatuh premiered in December 2014. The film adaptation of Dewi ‘Dee’ Lestari’s bestselling novel of the same title is based on the first installation of the Supernova series. Since then, Arifin has played in various movies, including Negeri Van Oranje (2015), Sabtu Bersama Bapak (2016), and The Professionals (2016). He has also collaborated with HBO Asia on its first original TV Series Halfworlds and in 2017, Arifin reprised his role as Barata in Season 2. The show aired in 26 countries all across the Asia Pacific region.

Activism 
Apart from his career in the film industry, Arifin has been active in various philanthropic endeavours, mainly regarding environmental issues. He has been appointed as a WWF Warrior by the World Wildlife Fund Indonesia, and in 2017, as an ambassador for the Dugong and Seagrass Conservation Project (DSCP). The effort is a collaboration between the Indonesian Ministry of Marine Affairs and Fisheries, the Indonesian Institute of Sciences, Bogor Agricultural University, and WWF Indonesia, directed towards the preservation and protection of dugongs and seagrasses.

Filmography

Accolades

References

External links
 

1987 births
Living people
Indonesian actors
People from Jakarta